

Background
Judges John F. Scileppi, Francis Bergan, and James Gibson would reach the constitutional age limit of 70 years at the end of the year.

The 1972 New York state election was held on November 7, 1972, to elect three judges of the New York Court of Appeals, as well as all members of the New York State Assembly and the New York State Senate. Despite efforts by Governor Nelson A. Rockefeller and others, no woman was designated by any party for the Court of Appeals. Family Judge Nanette Dembitz was fourth placed in the vote of the Democratic State Committee, and challenged the party designees.

Nominations

Democratic primary
The Democratic State Committee met on April 3, and designated Appellate Justices  Lawrence H. Cooke and M. Henry Martuscello; and Supreme Court Justice Bernard S. Meyer for the Court of Appeals. On April 14, Family Court Judge Nanette Dembitz announced her challenge to the designees,. and a primary was held on June 20.

Other parties
The Republican State Committee met on April 3 at Albany, New York, and designated Appellate Justice Dominick L. Gabrielli, Supreme Court Justice Sol Wachler and lawyer Hugh R. Jones, President of the New York State Bar Association, for the Court of Appeals.

The Liberal State Committee met on April 3, and designated Democrats M. Henry Martuscello and Bernard S. Meyer; and Republican Sol Wachtler for the Court of Appeals. Martuscello lost the Democratic nomination in the primary, and ran on the Liberal ticket only. 

The Conservative State Committee met on April 4, and designated Republicans Dominick L. Gabrielli and Hugh R. Jones, and Democrat Lawrence H. Cooke for the Court of Appeals.

The designees of the Republican, Liberal and Conservative parties were not challenged in primaries.

Result
The whole Republican ticket was elected.

Notes

Sources
Official result: NIXON WON STATE BY 1,241,694 VOTES; Albany Tally Shows 79.5% of Those Registered Voted in NYT on December 12, 1972 (subscription required)
New York Red Book 1973

See also
New York state elections
1972 United States presidential election

1972
 
New York